Doto orcha is a species of sea slug, a nudibranch, a marine gastropod mollusc in the family Dotidae.

Distribution
This species was first described from the Gulf of Aquaba, Red Sea.

Description
This nudibranch is very elongate with paired cerata which are widely spaced down the length of the body.

EcologyDoto orcha feeds on the hydroid Dynamena disticha''.

References

Dotidae
Gastropods described in 2000